is a 2014 French-Japanese film directed by Yūkichi Ōtsuka. Japanese actress, Mayuko Fukuda played the lead role. It was released on April 26, 2014.

Cast
 Mayuko Fukuda as Flare Mitsui
 Valentin Bonhomme as Jean Ozon
 Alice Hirose
 Mitsuki Tanimura
 Masaya Kato
 Sayaka Yamaguchi

References

External links
  
 

2014 films
French drama films
2010s French-language films
2010s Japanese films
Japanese drama films
2010s Japanese-language films
2010s French films